The Raether limit is the physical limiting value of the multiplication factor (M) or gas gain in an ionization avalanche process (Townsend avalanche). 

Even though, theoretically, it seems as if M can increase without limit (exponentially), physically, it is limited to about M < 108 or αx < 20 (where α is the first Townsend coefficient and x is the length of the path of ionization, starting from the point of the primary ionization.

Heinz Raether postulated that this was due to the effect of the space charge on the electric field.

The multiplication factor or gas gain is of fundamental importance for the operation of the proportional counter and geiger counter ionising radiation detectors.

Sources

 The Mechanism of the Electric Spark By Leonard Benedict Loeb, John M. Meek. Stanford University Press, 1941 
 High Voltage Engineering, M S Naidu, V Kamarju.  Tata McGraw-Hill Education, 2009 

Particle detectors
Ionization
Electrical phenomena